Paul Fitzwater (born March 5, 1959 ) is a Republican former member of the Missouri House of Representatives, representing the 144th district which includes  parts of Washington, Iron, Reynolds and Wayne Counties.

Personal life

Background and education

Fitzwater is a retired school teacher and coach.
He has been honored on a number of occasions as Coach of the Year while coaching high school track and field. Fitzwater also worked as a high school and college basketball referee. He owns and operates Fitzwater and Son Concrete.

Fitzwater attends First Baptist Church. He is a member of the National Rifle Association.

Fitzwater is a graduate of Potosi High School. He received his B.A. in Education from Tarkio College in 1981.

Born March 5, 1959 in Potosi, Fitzwater currently resides there with his wife, Sandy. They have four children, Phoebe, Philip, Katherine and Kelsey.

External links
Fitzwater's official Missouri House of Representatives page (archived, February 2017)

1959 births
21st-century American politicians
Living people
Members of the Missouri House of Representatives
People from Potosi, Missouri
Tarkio College alumni